This was the first edition of the women's tournament.

World No. 1 Dinara Safina defeated Caroline Wozniacki 6–2, 6–4 for the title.

Seeds

The four Rome semifinalists received a bye into the second round. They were as follows:
  Dinara Safina (champion)
  Venus Williams (second round)
  Svetlana Kuznetsova (second round)
  Victoria Azarenka (third round)

Draw

Finals

Top half

Section 1

Section 2

Bottom half

Section 3

Section 4

External links
Main Draw
Qualifying Draw

Mutua Women's Singles
Women's Singles